Peter Godwin Van Winkle (September 7, 1808April 15, 1872) was an American lawyer, businessman and politician. For many years a leading officer of the Northwestern Virginia Railroad, he became one of the founders of West Virginia and a United States senator.

Early and family life
Born in New York City to an established family, Van Winkle completed preparatory studies, studied law, and was admitted to the bar. He married Juliet Rathbone, the eldest daughter of William Palmer Rathbone (1784 - 1862) and his wife Martha Ming Valleau Rathbone (1793 - 1846), an influential family in western Virginia who were developing the oil field at Burning Springs. Four years later, the Van Winkles had moved to Parkersburg, Virginia (now West Virginia). They had three children who survived to adulthood.

Career
After further studies locally with lawyer and General John Jay Jackson Sr., Van Winkle began his legal practice in Parkersburg in 1835. He was president of the town board of trustees from 1844 until 1850. In 1850, Wood County voters also elected Van Winkle to represent at the Virginia State constitutional convention in 1850. He was treasurer and later president of the Northwestern Virginia Railroad Co. beginning in 1852 through the American Civil War as discussed below.

After Virginia seceded from the Union, much to the distress of many in its northwestern corner, Wood County voters elected Van Winkle to the second Wheeling Convention in 1861. He helped organize the Restored Government of Virginia and also served in 1862 as an influential delegate to the convention which framed the constitution of West Virginia. He was also elected to the first session of the West Virginia House of Delegates in 1863. When West Virginia was admitted as a State into the Union, voters elected Van Winkle as a Unionist to the U.S. Senate, where he served from August 4, 1863, to March 3, 1869. While in the Senate, Van Winkle was chairman of the Committee on Pensions (Fortieth Congress).

During President Andrew Johnson's impeachment trial, Van Winkle broke party ranks, along with nine other Republican senators and voted for acquittal, defying their party and public opinion in voting against conviction (which failed by one vote). Seven of these Republican senators were disturbed by how the proceedings had been manipulated in order to give a one-sided presentation of the evidence. The other senators who voted against impeachment along with him were James Dixon, James Rood Doolittle, William Pitt Fessenden, Joseph S. Fowler, James W. Grimes, John B. Henderson, Lyman Trumbull, Daniel S. Norton, and Edmund G. Ross (the latter of whom provided the decisive vote). After the trial, Congressman Benjamin Butler conducted hearings on the widespread reports that Republican senators had been bribed to vote for Johnson's acquittal. In Butler's hearings, and in subsequent inquiries, there was increasing evidence that some acquittal votes were acquired by promises of patronage jobs and cash cards.

West Virginia Governor Arthur Boreman was elected to succeed Van Winkle.

Van Winkle also served as a delegate to the Southern Loyalist Convention at Philadelphia, Pennsylvania in 1866.

Death and legacy
Van Winkle died in Parkersburg in 1872. He was buried beside his wife (whom he had survived by nearly three decades) in Riverview Cemetery.

Marshall Van Winkle, Peter Van Winkle's grandnephew, was a U.S. Representative from New Jersey in the Fifty-ninth Congress.

His former home at Parkersburg, now known as the Peter G. Van Winkle House, is a contributing property in the Julia-Ann Square Historic District.

References

External Links
West Virginia & Regional History Center at West Virginia University, Peter G. Van Winkle papers

1808 births
1872 deaths
Politicians from New York City
Godwin Family
American people of Dutch descent
Unconditional Union Party United States senators from West Virginia
Republican Party United States senators from West Virginia
West Virginia Unconditional Unionists
Republican Party members of the West Virginia House of Delegates
Politicians from Parkersburg, West Virginia
Trustees of populated places in Virginia
People of West Virginia in the American Civil War
Delegates of the 1861 Wheeling Convention